KMXR (93.9 FM, "Big 93.9") is a radio station broadcasting a classic hits format. Licensed to Corpus Christi, Texas, United States, the station serves the Corpus Christi area.  The station is currently owned by iHeartMedia.  The station's studios and offices are located on Old Brownsville Road in Corpus Christi near the airport, and its transmitter tower is located in Robstown, Texas.

History
The station was originally licensed and constructed by the legendary Col. Vann M. Kennedy,  a pioneer Texas broadcaster.  Col. Kennedy was perhaps best known for giving Walter Cronkite his first job in news while Cronkite attended UT Austin,  and,  as Cronkite later described it,  "teaching me to write."  Mr. Kennedy also built KZTV, Channel 10, Corpus Christi,  and KVTV, Channel 13, Laredo, along with KSIX,  a pioneer South Texas AM.  The 93.9FM frequency was originally licensed as KSIX-FM,  with the call letters changed to KEXX which offered adult contemporary format in the early 1980s.   The station was assigned the call letters KSTE on December 2, 1985 on its sale to American Wireless Company.  KSTE offered an adult contemporary format.

On April 1, 1989, the station changed its call sign to the current KMXR.

On December 26, 2014 KMXR rebranded as "Big 93.9".

References

External links

MXR
IHeartMedia radio stations